The 2023 York United FC season is the fifth season in the history of York United FC. In addition to the Canadian Premier League, the club will compete in the Canadian Championship.

Current squad
As of March 8, 2023.

Transfers

In

Draft picks 
York United selected the following players in the 2023 CPL–U Sports Draft. Draft picks are not automatically signed to the team roster. Only those who are signed to a contract will be listed as transfers in.

Out

Transferred out

Loans out

Pre-season and friendlies

Competitions 
Matches are listed in Toronto local time: Eastern Daylight Time (UTC−4) until November 5, and Eastern Standard Time (UTC−5) otherwise.

Overview

Canadian Premier League

Table

Results by match

Matches

Canadian Championship

Statistics

Squad and statistics 

|-
! colspan="14" style="background:#dcdcdc; text-align:center"| Goalkeepers

|-
! colspan="14" style="background:#dcdcdc; text-align:center"| Defenders

|-
! colspan="14" style="background:#dcdcdc; text-align:center"| Midfielders

|-
! colspan="14" style="background:#dcdcdc; text-align:center"| Forwards

|}

Notes

References

External links 
 Official site

2023
2023 Canadian Premier League
Canadian soccer clubs 2023 season
2023 in Ontario